Bregvadze is a Georgian surname. Notable people with the surname include:
Bakhva Bregvadze (born 1985), Georgian TV host, actor, publisher, marketer and radio presenter
Jaba Bregvadze (born 1987), Georgian rugby union player
Nani Bregvadze (born 1936), Georgian Soviet singer and actress

Georgian-language surnames
Surnames of Georgian origin